David Edward Plummer (born October 9, 1985) is a retired American competition swimmer who specialized in backstroke events. He won bronze and gold medals at the 2016 Summer Olympics.

Swimming career

At the 2010 FINA Short Course World Championships in Dubai, Plummer won a gold medal in the 4×100-meter medley relay for his contributions in the heats. Plummer also competed in the 50- and 100-meter backstroke in Dubai but finished out of medal contention in both events.

At the 2011 World Aquatics Championships in Shanghai, Plummer placed fifth in the final of the 100-meter backstroke with a time of 53.04.  In the 50-meter backstroke final, Plummer placed fifth with a time of 24.92.  On the last day of competition, Plummer won a gold medal in the 4×100-meter medley relay for his contributions in the heats.

At the 2013 U.S. National Championships, Plummer qualified to swim in two individual events at the 2013 World Aquatics Championships. At the National Championships, he finished first in the 100-meter backstroke with a time of 53.10, upsetting the Olympic gold medalist Matt Grevers. Plummer also finished first in the 50-meter backstroke, breaking the US Open record in the process with a time of 24.52.

At the 2013 World Aquatics Championships, Plummer swam in 3 events: the 100-meter backstroke, the 50-meter backstroke, and the prelims of the 4x100-meter medley relay. In the individual 100-meter backstroke, Plummer finished second in the event, finishing behind teammate Matt Grevers with a time of 53.12 and improving upon his 5th-place finish from 2011. In the 50-meter backstroke, Plummer slipped on the start in the semifinals, causing him to finish 16th overall, unable to qualify for the finals. Plummer lost out his last chance of a gold medal in the 4x100-meter medley relay, when the team was disqualified for a false start in the final.

In 2016, he placed second in the 100 m backstroke at the US Olympic Swimming Trials.

At the 2016 Summer Olympics, Plummer won the bronze medal in the 100-meter backstroke final in a time of 52.40 seconds. Additionally, Plummer won a gold medal as a member of the 4x100-meter medley relay.

In January 2017, Plummer officially retired from competitive swimming.

Personal life
Plummer was born in Norman, Oklahoma, to Don and Kathy Plummer. He has three brothers: Roy, Ryan, and Nate, all of whom are former swimmers. Plummer graduated from the University of Minnesota in 2008. In 2012, he married Dr. Erin Forster; they have two sons, Will and Ricky.

Plummer worked as head coach for the Wayzata boys swim and dive team. During his first year as acting coach, Plummer led the team to its first-ever state title on the way to winning Minnesota state coach of the year. In his second year as coach, the Trojans finished the season with a 1–5 record, but finished the season with a victory at sections and a top-10 finish at the state meet. After winning sections for a third straight year with the Wayzata Trojans, Plummer accepted a position at the University of Minnesota Aquatics Center.

References

External links
 
 
 
 
 
 
 

1985 births
Living people
American male backstroke swimmers
Medalists at the 2016 Summer Olympics
Medalists at the FINA World Swimming Championships (25 m)
Olympic bronze medalists for the United States in swimming
Sportspeople from Norman, Oklahoma
Swimmers at the 2016 Summer Olympics
World Aquatics Championships medalists in swimming
Olympic gold medalists for the United States in swimming
20th-century American people
21st-century American people